"Liefde is een kaartspel" ("Love is a Card Game") was the  entry in the Eurovision Song Contest 1996, performed in Dutch by Lisa del Bo.

The song was performed seventeenth on the night, following the ' Maxine & Franklin Brown with "De eerste keer" and preceding 's Eimear Quinn with "The Voice". At the close of voting, it had received 22 points, placing 16th in a field of 23.

The song features Del Bo likening love to a card game. She describes a relationship which appears not to have been based on honesty, which explains the metaphor. The song was recorded in Dutch, French (as "Comme au jeu de cartes"), English ("Love is Like a Card Game") and German ("Liebe ist ein Kartenspiel").

Due to the contest's rapid expansion, entry in the 1997 contest was limited to those countries with the best average scores over the past five years – a group of which Belgium again was not a member, the first time being at the 1994 contest. As a "passive country" (one which broadcast but did not enter the contest), Belgium was, however, able to enter the 1998 edition. Thus, "Liefde is een kaartspel" was succeeded as Belgian representative at the 1998 contest by Mélanie Cohl singing "Dis oui".

The song became part of a controversy after it was claimed that the   Eurovision entry "Listen to Your Heartbeat" was plagiarised from it. At first this was denied by the Swedish songwriters, one of whom was Thomas G:son, but after the Belgian songwriters and the author's organisation SABAM pressed for legal action, a cash settlement was agreed.

Charts

External links
 Official Eurovision Song Contest site, history by year, 1996.
 Detailed info and lyrics, The Diggiloo Thrush, "Liede is een kaartspel".

References

Dutch-language Belgian songs
Eurovision songs of Belgium
Eurovision songs of 1996
1996 songs